Myrlene Dawn Jones  (born 1940) is a New Zealand netball umpire who spent 15 years as New Zealand's top-ranked umpire and officiated at four netball world championships. She was also a netball administrator, a school principal and a justice of the peace.

Early life
Jones was born in Ōtāhuhu, a suburb of Auckland. Her father was a wrestler and also coached rugby in Papatoetoe, near Auckland. She attended the Auckland Girls' Grammar School in Newton, where one of her teachers fostered a love of mathematics, at a time when girls were not encouraged to become mathematicians. Jones graduated from the University of Auckland with a Bachelor of Arts degree in 1942. She would go on to work at Papatoetoe High School as a maths teacher.

Umpiring career
In the 1960s Jones obtained local and national umpiring qualifications in netball and in 1974 was appointed to accompany the New Zealand national netball team to England, at the beginning of an international umpiring career in which she was the top-ranked umpire in the country for 15 years. She became president of the New Zealand Umpires Association in 1975. She umpired 85 test matches, including in four world championships and two World Games, together with more than 200 other first-class matches. She became president of Netball New Zealand in 1987. On retiring from active umpiring, she became a member of the International Netball Federation's umpiring committee, chairing its umpiring advisory panel from its establishment in 2008 until 2013, and was a key force behind the introduction of new rules and a new rule book.

Other activities
Between 1975 and 1993 Jones was principal of the Diocesan School for Girls, Auckland. A sports centre at the school was named after her. She also served as a Justice of the peace.

Awards and honours
In the 1994 New Year Honours Jones was made an Officer of the Order of the British Empire (OBE) for her services to both netball and education. In 1999 she was given the Ultimate Umpire Award, on the occasion of Netball New Zealand's 75th anniversary celebrations, for her outstanding umpiring. She has received service awards from the International Netball Federation and Netball New Zealand and was awarded life membership of Netball New Zealand. In 2015, Jones was awarded a lifetime achievement award at the Halberg Awards, named after the New Zealand runner, Sir Murray Halberg, who won the 5000 metres race at the 1960 Olympic Games, despite suffering from a withered arm. In the 2016 Birthday Honours, she was a made a Companion of the New Zealand Order of Merit (CNZM)

References

Living people
Date of birth missing (living people)
New Zealand netball umpires
New Zealand netball administrators
Companions of the New Zealand Order of Merit
New Zealand Officers of the Order of the British Empire
People educated at Auckland Girls' Grammar School
Heads of schools in New Zealand
New Zealand justices of the peace
People from Auckland
University of Auckland alumni
1940 births